Pudu (Chinese: 富都, alt. 半山芭) is a ward of Kuala Lumpur located along the Federal Route 1 Pudu Road. It houses Pudu Sentral (Kuala Lumpur's oldest bus station) and formerly Pudu Prison. Pudu Market is one of the largest wet markets in Kuala Lumpur. Adjacent to it is Jalan Pasar (Pasar Road) where there are shops selling electronics components and devices.

During colonial rule, Pudu was known as Pudoh.

Pudu is sandwiched between Bukit Bintang, Maluri and Cheras.

The Bukit Bintang City Centre development is located at the border of Pudu and Bukit Bintang right beside of the Hang Tuah LRT and monorail station.

The Ampang Line and Sri Petaling Line  Pudu LRT station's sign was used in the movie Entrapment, although it was the  Bukit Jalil LRT station that was used as the filming location.

Transportation
 Pudu LRT station

Education
 Tung Shin Academy Of Nursing

Politics
Pudu is mostly located in the Bukit Bintang parliamentary constituency, though a part spills over into Cheras constituency,

References

Suburbs in Kuala Lumpur